Sona Iskander gizi Akhundova-Garayeva (16 October 1898, Baku – 19 October 1971) was an Azerbaijani poetess and one of the first women in Azerbaijan to receive higher education. She was a mother of composer Gara Garayev and doctor Mursal Garayev.

Early life and education 
Sona Iskander gizi Akhundova was born on 16 October 1898 in Baku. Her father was Iskander Mirza Abdulhuseyn bey oglu Akhundov, a graduate of the University of Krakow-Jagiellonian, and mother Zuleykha Bayramalibeyova, one of the educated and enlightened women of her time.

At the age of 13 Akhundova’s parents sent her to a girls’ school under the Baku Municipality. After graduating from this school, she continued her education at the Baku branch of St. Nina School. Later Akhundova studied piano music.

Akhundova showed interest in poetry when she was still in school. With the help of Shafiqa khanum, she found and read poems of Mirza Alakbar Sabir and was also aware of satirical poems, articles and caricatures published in the magazine "Molla Nasreddin".

Sona Akhundova-Garayeva died on 19 October 1971.

Work 
One of the most famous Akhundova’s poems “Vatan” was included in the book "Ashugs and poets of Azerbaijan" published in 1974.

Reviews about Sona khanum's poems were published in the beginning of the last century in "Sada", "Ishik", "Kaspi", "Zaqafqazskaya rech" and other newspapers. Akhundova cooperated with the first women’s newspaper “Ishig” and regularly published her poems there.

Personal life 
Akhundova married Abulfaz Garayev, a prominent doctor, honored scientist, and they had two sons – Gara and Mursal Garayevs. Gara Garayev became a world-known composer, while Mursal Garayev – a prominent doctor.

Legacy 
On 16 October 2018, the Azerbaijan Writer’s Union presented a book “Sona Akhundova-Garayeva. A Memorial Book” dedicated to 120th anniversary of Akhundova-Garayeva at the House-Museum of Gara Garayev . The book is written in three languages: Azerbaijani, English and Russian.

References 

1898 births
1971 deaths
Azerbaijani women poets
20th-century Azerbaijani women
People from Baku